Abbes Harchi (born 11 May 1936) is a Moroccan épée and foil fencer. He competed in three events at the 1960 Summer Olympics.

References

External links
 

1936 births
Living people
Moroccan male épée fencers
Olympic fencers of Morocco
Fencers at the 1960 Summer Olympics
Sportspeople from Casablanca
Moroccan male foil fencers
20th-century Moroccan people